Kimball is a surname, and may refer to:
Note: A person may be listed in more than one section.

Architects
 Francis H. Kimball (1845–1919), American architect best known for his work on skyscrapers in lower Manhattan
 Thomas Rogers Kimball (1862–1934), Omaha architect

Artists and animators
 Alonzo Myron Kimball (1874–1923), American portrait artist and illustrator
 Katharine Kimball (1866–1949), American artist, illustrator and etcher
 Ward Kimball (1914–2002), one of Walt Disney's main animators, the "Nine Old Men"

Jurists and lawyers
 Catherine D. Kimball, Chief Justice of the Louisiana Supreme Court
 Derrick Kimball (born 1954), Canadian lawyer and former politician
 Edward L. Kimball (1930–2016), American scholar, lawyer, law professor and historian
 Ralph Kimball (judge), Associate Justice of the Wyoming Supreme Court

Musicians
 Bobby Kimball (born 1947), the lead and background singer in the American rock/pop band Toto
 Cheyenne Kimball (born 1990), American singer
 Jennifer Kimball, vocalist, songwriter, and multi-instrumentalist who was part of The Story along with Jonatha Brooke
 Jim Kimball, American punk drummer

Mormons
 Andrew Kimball (1858–1924), American politician and a mission president and stake president in The Church of Jesus Christ of Latter-day Saints, son of Heber Kimball
 Heber C. Kimball  (1801–1868), leader in the early Latter Day Saint movement
 Helen Mar Kimball (1828–1896), one of Joseph Smith's wives
 Spencer W. Kimball (1895–1985), 12th president of The Church of Jesus Christ of Latter-day Saints

Politicians
 Alanson M. Kimball (1827–1913), U.S. Representative from Wisconsin
 Alonzo Kimball (1808–1900), 14th & 16th mayor of Green Bay, Wisconsin
 Andrew Kimball (1858–1924), American politician and Mormon
 Clem F. Kimball (1868–1928), Iowa Lieutenant Governor
 Derrick Kimball (born 1954), Canadian lawyer and former politician
 Fenner Kimball (1822–1899), American manufacturer, businessman and politician
 Henry M. Kimball (1878–1935), U.S. Representative from Michigan
 John W. Kimball (1828–1910), American soldier and politician who served as Massachusetts Auditor 
 Marcus Kimball, Baron Kimball (1928–2014), British Conservative politician
 Martin L. Kimball (1826–1891), Wisconsin state senator
 Philip Kimball (1918-2005), Massachusetts state legislator
 William P. Kimball (1857–1926), U.S. Representative from Kentucky

Soldiers
 Ivory Kimball (1843–1916), Union Army soldier
 John W. Kimball (1828–1910), American soldier and politician who served as Massachusetts Auditor 
 Nathan Kimball (1822–1898), American Civil War general
 William Wirt Kimball (1848–1930), U.S. naval officer

Sports figures
 Bruce Kimball (born 1963), American diver and coach
 Charlie Kimball, American racecar driver
 Dick Kimball (born c. 1935), American former diver and coach
 Eddie Kimball (1903–1990), American football player, football and basketball coach, and college athletics administrator
 Jeremy Kimball (born 1991), American mixed martial arts fighter
 Mary Ellen Kimball, All-American Girls Professional Baseball League player
 Nikki Kimball (born 1971), American ultramarathoner
 Toby Kimball (1942–2017), American National Basketball Association player

Writers
 Dan Kimball, author
 George E Kimball III (1943–2011), author
 Harriet McEwen Kimball (1834–1917), American poet, hymnwriter, philanthropist, hospital co-founder
 Maria Brace Kimball (1852–1933), American educator, elocutionist, writer
 Michael Kimball (born 1967), American novelist
 Roger Kimball (born 1953), conservative U.S art critic, essayist, and social commentator

Others
 Christopher Kimball, cooking magazine editor and TV host
 Donna Kimball, American muppeteer
 Edward Kimball (1859–1938), American stage and silent film actor
 Edward Kimball (1823-1901), Sunday School teacher and church debt raiser
 George E. Kimball, pioneer of Operations Research
 Hannibal Kimball, nineteenth century entrepreneur
 Ralph Kimball, author of publications on data warehousing and business intelligence
 Scott Lee Kimball, convicted serial killer
 Solon Toothaker Kimball, noted educator and anthropologist
 Sumner Increase Kimball (1832-1924), organizer of and general superintendent of the United States Life-Saving Service, predecessor of the United States Coast Guard
 William Wallace Kimball (1828–1904), Chicago piano manufacturer and founder of the Kimball Piano Company, now Kimball International
 Alyssa Heather Kimball (born 2008), Attender of Crestwood Secondary Highschool and daughter of Nancy Patricia Kimball and Stephen Kimball